Wolmirstedt is a former Verwaltungsgemeinschaft ("collective municipality") in the district of Börde, in Saxony-Anhalt, Germany. The seat of the Verwaltungsgemeinschaft was in Wolmirstedt. It was disbanded in January 2009.

The Verwaltungsgemeinschaft Wolmirstedt consisted of the following municipalities (population in 2006 between brackets):
 Farsleben (966)
 Wolmirstedt (10.369)

Former Verwaltungsgemeinschaften in Saxony-Anhalt